North Colonie Central Schools is a public school district located in Colonie, New York. It shares Colonie along with the South Colonie Central School District and covers the communities of Latham, Loudonville, and Cohoes. It was ranked the number 4 school district in the Capital District by The Business Review in their 2012 Schools Report. On the official website of North Colonie, it is stated that over 6,000 students attend the school district.

Board of education
Current members of the board of education are:
Linda Harrison, President
Matthew Cannon, Vice President
Mary Alber
Nicholas Comproski
Michelle Dischiavo
Samuel Johnson 
Pennie Grinnell
Mary Nardolillo
Sandy Pangburn

Schools
The district is made up of 6 elementary schools for students in kindergarten through 5th grade. 6th, 7th and 8th grade students attend Shaker Middle School, which feeds Shaker High School for grades 9 through 12.

The district contains the following schools: 
Southgate Elementary School, Loudonville, Principal - Jerri Lynne Dedrick
Latham Ridge Elementary School, Latham, Principal - Aaron Thiell
Loudonville Elementary School, Loudonville, Principal - Scott Thompson
Forts Ferry Elementary School, Latham, Principal - Casey Parker
Boght Hills Elementary School, Cohoes, Principal - Marcus Puccioni
Blue Creek Elementary School, Latham, Principal - Annette Trapini
Shaker Middle School, Latham, Principal - Davis Chamberlain
Shaker High School, Latham, Principal - Jim Wager

References

External links
North Colonie Central Schools
2012 Schools Report
The Shaker Bison

School districts in New York (state)
Education in Albany County, New York